Sofiane Daham (born 15 January 1996) is an Algerian professional footballer who plays for Châteauroux as a midfielder.

Career
In January 2016, Daham signed a professional contract with Sochaux.

On 2 July 2021, he moved to Châteauroux on a two-year contract.

References

External links
 
 

Living people
1996 births
People from Saïda
Association football midfielders
Algerian footballers
Algerian expatriates in France
French sportspeople of Algerian descent
FC Sochaux-Montbéliard players
LB Châteauroux players
Ligue 2 players
Championnat National players
Championnat National 2 players
Championnat National 3 players